Diego Polo the Younger (1620–1655) was a Spanish painter of the Baroque period. He was the nephew of the elder Diego Polo. He was born in Burgos. He was a scholar of Antonio Lanchares.

He painted several pictures for the churches at Madrid, among them, the Baptism of Christ for the church of the Carmelites and an Annunciation for the church of Santa Maria. He also excelled in portraiture.

References

1620 births
1655 deaths
People from the Province of Burgos
17th-century Spanish painters
Spanish male painters
Spanish Baroque painters